Reeds Station (also known as Reeds) is an unincorporated community in DeSoto Township, Jackson County, Illinois, United States.

References

Unincorporated communities in Jackson County, Illinois
Unincorporated communities in Illinois